Area code 979 is a telephone area code in the North American Numbering Plan (NANP) for the U.S. state of Texas. The numbering plan area comprises the region generally following the Brazos River found between the Austin and Houston metro areas and its surrounding communities, stretching from just south of Waco to the Gulf Coast.  It was created on February 13, 2000, in a split from area code 409.

Service area
The counties served by area code 979 are:
Austin, Brazoria, Brazos, Burleson, Colorado, Fayette, Fort Bend, Lee, Matagorda, Milam, Robertson, Waller, Washington and Wharton.

The area includes the following cities and towns: 
Alleyton, Altair, Angleton, Bay City, Beasley, Bellville, Bleiblerville, Boling, Brazoria, Brenham, Bryan, Burton, Caldwell, Calvert, Carmine, Cat Spring, Cedar Lane, Chappell Hill, Chriesman, Clute, College Station, Columbus, Damon, Danbury, Danciger, Danevang, Deanville, Dime Box, Eagle Lake, East Bernard, Egypt, El Campo, Ellinger, Fayetteville, Franklin, Freeport, Garwood, Gause, Giddings, Glen Flora, Glidden, Guy, Hearne, Hempstead, Hungerford, Industry, Kendleton, Kenney, Kurten, La Grange, Lake Jackson, Lane City, Ledbetter, Lexington, Lincoln, Lissie, Louise, Lyons, Markham, Matagorda, Millican, Mumford, Nada, Navasota, Needville, New Baden, New Ulm, Oakland, Old Ocean, Orchard, Pierce, Pledger, Plum, Prairie Hill, Pine Island, Rock Island, Round Top, San Felipe, Schulenburg, Sealy, Sheridan, Somerville, Sweeny, Van Vleck, Wadsworth, Wallis, Warda, Warrenton, Weimar, Wellborn, West Columbia, West Point, Wharton, and Wheelock.

See also

List of Texas area codes

External links

 List of exchanges from AreaCodeDownload.com, 979 Area Code

979
979
Brazos County, Texas